St Augustine's Church is an Anglican church in Christchurch, New Zealand. It is registered as Category II by Heritage New Zealand.

History 
Collins and Harman designed St Augustine's Church. The church opened in 1908 and the service was led by Bishop Julius. A bell tower and spire were added in 1914. Between 1954 and 1999 three more additions were made to the church.

References

External links 

 Church website

Churches in Christchurch
Heritage New Zealand Category 2 historic places in Canterbury, New Zealand
2011 Christchurch earthquake
Listed churches in New Zealand
1900s architecture in New Zealand